The Family Coalition Party of British Columbia was a social conservative, anti-abortion provincial political party in British Columbia, Canada.

In the 1991 election, it nominated 8 candidates in the province's 75 ridings. They won a total of 1,310 votes, or 0.09% of the provincial total. In the 1996 election, it nominated 14 candidates in the province's 75 ridings. They won a total of  4,150 votes, or 0.26% of the provincial total. None of its candidates was ever elected to the Legislative Assembly of British Columbia.

On November 25, 2000, it merged with four other conservative parties to form the British Columbia Unity Party. The other parties subsequently left the coalition, leaving the Family Coalition Party to continue with the "Unity" name by itself.

References

Further reading

See also
List of political parties in Canada

Conservative parties in Canada
Defunct political parties in Canada
Provincial political parties in British Columbia
Political parties with year of establishment missing
Political parties with year of disestablishment missing
1990s establishments in British Columbia
Political parties established in the 1990s
2000 disestablishments in British Columbia
Political parties disestablished in 2000